The International Society of Nephrology (ISN) is an organization concerned with kidney health.

Introduction

The ISN has over 9,000 professional members from more than 156 countries. In addition, the ISN closely collaborates with over 100 national and regional nephrology societies around the world, representing about 40,000 professionals.

In 1992 the society formed a task force to provide emergency dialysis services in areas struck by disasters (usually earthquakes), where numerous victims may develop acute kidney injury due to crush syndrome. Supported by Médecins Sans Frontières, industry sponsors and professional associations, the Renal Disaster Relief Task Force sends renal nurses, technicians and doctors to the affected area. Since its establishment, it has assisted in a number of major earthquakes in several countries.

Publications

The society publishes three medical journals: Kidney International, Kidney International Supplements, and Kidney International Reports.

Current leadership

The current leadership of the ISN includes Agnes Fogo (president), Masaomi Nangaku (president-elect), Vivekanand Jha (past-president) and Charu Malik (executive director).

References

International medical associations
Kidney organizations